Kimble Lynard Anders (born September 10, 1966) is a former American football fullback in the National Football League.

Early years
He played college football at the University of Houston where he produced 261 carries for 1,359 yards and 16 TDs to go with 115 receptions for 1,718 and 11 scores.

Professional career
Kimble was signed as an undrafted free agent by the Pittsburgh Steelers in 1990. In 1991, he was signed as a free agent by the Kansas City Chiefs. He played for the Chiefs throughout his career. In 2022, the Chiefs announced he would be inducted into the team's Hall of Fame during the 2022 season.

Personal life
On April 4, 2013 it was announced that Anders would return to his home town of Galveston, TX to serve as Head Coach for Ball High School and Athletic Director for Galveston Independent School District.

References

External links
NFL.com player page
Running Back Giving Back Foundation
Kansas City Chiefs Ambassadors

1966 births
Living people
People from Galveston, Texas
American football fullbacks
Houston Cougars football players
Kansas City Chiefs players
American Conference Pro Bowl players